Abdanan County (Kurdish: ئاودانان) is in Ilam province, Iran. The capital of the county is the city of Abdanan. At the 2006 census, the county's population was 45,830 in 9,358 households. The following census in 2011 counted 46,977 people in 11,256 households. At the 2016 census, the county's population was 47,851 in 13,188 households. The county is populated by Kurds and Lurs.

Administrative divisions

The population history and structural changes of Abdanan County's administrative divisions over three consecutive censuses are shown in the following table. The latest census shows three districts, six rural districts, and three cities.

References

References

 

Counties of Ilam Province